William Strother Cowherd (September 1, 1860 – June 20, 1915) was a Democratic Mayor of Kansas City, Missouri from 1892–1894 and Congressman from Missouri from 1897–1905.

Early life
William Strother Cowherd was born on September 1, 1860, to Emily (née Strother) and Charles J. Cowherd near Lee's Summit, Missouri. He attended schools in Lee's Summit. He graduated from the University of Missouri in 1881 with a Bachelor of Arts and from the law school with a Bachelor of Laws in 1882.

Career
In 1882, Cowherd joined the Tichenor, Warner & Dean law firm. In 1883, Cowherd and John Campbell formed the Cowherd & Campbell law firm on Fifth Street in Kansas City. Cowherd was prosecuting attorney of Jackson County, Missouri from 1885–1889. In 1889, Cowherd formed the Teasdale, Ingraham, & Cowherd law firm with William B. Teasdale and R. J. Ingraham. It was later renamed Cowherd, Ingraham, Durham & Morse. He became first assistant city counselor of Kansas City in 1890. He served as mayor of Kansas City in 1892. He was elected as a Democrat to the Fifty-fifth and to the three succeeding Congresses (March 4, 1897 – March 3, 1905).

After failing to be re-elected to Congress, he ran unsuccessfully for Governor of Missouri in 1908. In 1909, he moved to Pasadena, California, and continued to practice law.

Personal life
Cowherd married Jessie Kitchen of Kansas City on September 25, 1889.

Cowherd died in Pasadena on June 20, 1915. He is buried in Lee's Summit Historical Cemetery.

References

External links

 

1860 births
1915 deaths
Mayors of Kansas City, Missouri
University of Missouri alumni
People from Lee's Summit, Missouri
Democratic Party members of the United States House of Representatives from Missouri
19th-century American politicians